Mnesarchus or Mnesarch  may refer to:
Father of Pythagoras
Mnesarchus of Athens, a Stoic philosopher, lived c. 100 BC
A possible name of the father of Euripides
Father of Callias of Chalcis
An assistant archon of Athens (thesmothete)